Maui Time Weekly (also known as Maui Time Magazine, Maui Time, and the Maui Times) is a free alternative newspaper published weekly in the county of Maui, state of Hawaii. The newspaper is owned mostly by its publisher, Tommy Russo.

Maui Time Weekly was launched in 1997. It serves all of Maui, and is distributed every Thursday. The paper has remained independently owned and operated throughout its existence.

History 

Begun as a free bi-weekly newsprint magazine, Maui Time offered a combination of music, sports, arts and community features, as well as Maui's first true entertainment calendar. The paper was founded by Tommy Russo and Mark D'Antonio.

Russo noted the lack of a strong community-based publication while traveling on Maui. At the time he was completing degree studies at Chico State University building a strong sales background in print media during his employment with a local paper in Chico, California. He teamed up with classmate D'Antonio after D'Antonio's music group, Sunset Red concluded two tours of Lahaina in 1996. Within a year, the two Chico, California transplants moved to Maui to start an independent community publication. Maui Time established a free and independent voice to represent the wide variety of views, opinions, lifestyles, and rich host culture that Maui offers.

Publisher Tommy Russo grew Maui Time into a weekly publication with Maui news, community features, arts and entertainment as its focus. Maui Time gained admission into the Association of Alternative Newsweeklies in 2004.

Regular features 
The paper runs a number of regular columns, most with an opinionated slant, that examine aspects of local government and politics. Maui Time also offers coverage of the local music scene, and carries Chuck Shepherd's syndicated column News of the Weird.

LC Watch keeps tabs on the Maui County Department of Liquor Control, while Rob Report, written by one-time Maui Mayoral candidate Rob Parsons, focuses on environmental issues. Coconut Wireless offers a roundup of the week's events with a satirical, sardonic tone.

Staff 
Axel Beers - Editor in Chief

References 

1. "Celebrating 10 Years of Independence". Maui Time Weekly. https://web.archive.org/web/20120717084243/http://www.mauitime.com/Articles-i-2007-06-28-174065.112113_Celebrating_10_Years_of_Independence.html
2. "Maui Time Weekly". Association of Alternative Newsweeklies.http://aan.org/alternative/Aan/ViewCompany?oid=oid%3A8413

External links 
"Maui Times" Website

Alternative weekly newspapers published in the United States
Newspapers published in Hawaii
Maui
Newspapers established in 1997
1997 establishments in Hawaii
American companies established in 1997